Onthyrion was a town of Histiaeotis in ancient Thessaly. It was merged by synoecism into Metropolis.

It is unlocated.

References

Populated places in ancient Thessaly
Former populated places in Greece
Lost ancient cities and towns
Histiaeotis